Emily Smith (born 25 May 1981) is a Scottish folk singer from Dumfries and Galloway. She went to school at Wallace Hall Academy and has a degree in Scottish music from The Royal Scottish Academy of Music and Drama. She is married to New Zealand-born fiddle player and guitarist Jamie McClennan.

Early life

Emily's childhood was spent dancing to music, rather than performing it, in her mother's dance school. She grew up assuming everyone knew how to do a highland fling and weekends were spent dancing at ceilidhs rather than nightclubs. Aged seven she started out on piano; moved onto snare drum in the local pipe band and subsequently found a passion for piano accordion, where at the age of eighteen she was National Mod champion. But it wasn't until a solo with the school choir in her late teens that Emily discovered her singing voice. She moved to Glasgow in 1999 where she gained an Honours degree in Scottish Music from the Royal Scottish Academy of Music and Drama. With principal study of Scots Song, she also studied accordion and piano.

Discography

Solo albums
 A Day Like Today (2002)
 A Different Life (2005)
 Too Long Away (2008)
 Adoon Winding Nith with Jamie McClennan (2009)
 Traiveller's Joy (2011)
 Ten Years (2013)
 A Winters Night – EP (2014)
 Echoes (2014)
 Songs for Christmas (2016)

Collaborations and guest appearances
 Faultlines – Karine Polwart (2003)
 Darwin Song Project – Various Artists (March 2009)
 Transatlantic Sessions 4 (October 2009)
 Adoon Winding Nith – with Jamie McClennan (November 2009)
 Sweet Visitor – Nancy Kerr (2014)
 Unplugged – Smith & McClennan (2018)
 Small Town Stories – Smith & McClennan (2020)

TV appearances

Recent TV appearances include:

 BBC Songs of Praise
 Transatlantic Sessions 4
 Scotland's Hogmanay Live (broadcast live from Glasgow)

Awards
 BBC Radio Scotland Young Traditional Musician award (2002)
 Scots Trad Music Awards: Scots Singer of the Year (2008)

References

External links

Living people
Scottish folk singers
People from Thornhill, Dumfries and Galloway
Place of birth missing (living people)
People educated at Wallace Hall Academy
1981 births
21st-century Scottish singers